Maze Sea Circuit is a 1.243mile (2 km) Japanese motor racing circuit at Maze, in the Iwamuro neighbourhood of  Nishikan-ku, Niigata city, Niigata Prefecture Japan.

History
The circuit was established in 1967 by Dr. Yoshikazu Fujita, a local physician. In 1970 the track was paved and redesigned into a road racing course. Between 1978 and 1987 the track was closed.

When it reopened in 1987, racing was changed to a clockwise direction. The track layout was also realigned to improve safety conditions.

In September 2008, Round 5 of the D1 Grand Prix with Nissan sporting coupés was held at the circuit.

References

External links
 Official circuit website 

Motorsport venues in Japan
Sports venues in Niigata Prefecture